Krzysztof Piskuła  (born 19 August 1973 in Poznań) is a Polish footballer who plays for Warta Poznań in the Polish First League.

Piskuła played several seasons in the Polish Ekstraklasa with Lech Poznań and Amica Wronki.  He also made one appearance for the Poland national football team in a friendly against New Zealand in 1999.

References

External links
 

1973 births
Living people
People from Luboń
Polish footballers
Poland international footballers
Warta Poznań players
Arka Gdynia players
Amica Wronki players
Lech Poznań players
Sportspeople from Greater Poland Voivodeship
Association football midfielders